Francisco Romero Portilla (born 27 May 1931) is a Guatemalan former sports shooter. He competed in the mixed trap event at the 1980 Summer Olympics.

References

External links
 

1931 births
Possibly living people
Guatemalan male sport shooters
Olympic shooters of Guatemala
Shooters at the 1980 Summer Olympics
Place of birth missing (living people)